The System is an American action film written and directed by Dallas Jackson and produced by SkullCrusher Films starring Tyrese Gibson,Terrence Howard, Jeremy Piven and Lil Yachty.

Cast
Tyrese Gibson
Jeremy Piven
Terrence Howard
Lil Yachty

Production
The film was shot in Jackson, Mississippi.

Release
In August 2021, it was announced that The Avenue acquired North American distribution rights to the film, which was released in theaters on October 28, 2022.  It was also released in digital platforms on November 4, 2022.

Reception
The film has a 40% rating on Rotten Tomatoes based on five reviews.

References

External links
 

Films shot in Mississippi
Hood films